Luther Hilton Foster Jr. (March 21, 1913 - November 27, 1994) was an African-American academic administrator. He served as the fourth president of the Tuskegee Institute, a private, historically black university in Tuskegee, Alabama now known as Tuskegee University, from 1953 to 1981.

Early life
Foster was born on March 21, 1913, in Lawrenceville, Virginia. His father worked for Saint Paul's College, a historically black college. He grew up between Lawrenceville and Petersburg.

Foster graduated from Virginia State University, where he earned a bachelor's degree in 1932, followed by a second bachelor's degree from Hampton University in 1934. He earned an MBA from the Harvard Business School in 1936, followed by a master's degree and a PhD from the University of Chicago in 1941 and 1951 respectively.

Career
Foster began his career at Howard University, where he worked as a budget officer from 1937 to 1941. Foster joined the Tuskegee Institute, now known as Tuskegee University, in 1941, where he worked as a business manager until 1953. He served as its fourth president from 1953 to 1981, which included the Civil Rights era. Under his leadership, enrollment grew from 2,000 to 3,500.

Foster served as the president of the United Negro College Fund and the Academy for Educational Development. He also served on the board of the Joint Center for Political and Economic Studies and Sears.

Foster was inducted into the Alabama Academy of Honor. In 1958, he was awarded the Star of Africa from Liberia.

Personal life and death
Foster married social worker Vera Chandler in 1941. They had two children. He resided in Alexandria, Virginia.

Foster died of a heart attack on November 27, 1994, in East Point, Georgia, at 81.

References

1913 births
1994 deaths
People from Lawrenceville, Virginia
People from Alexandria, Virginia
Virginia State University alumni
Hampton University alumni
Harvard Business School alumni
University of Chicago alumni
Tuskegee University presidents
American corporate directors
Sears Holdings people
African-American academics
20th-century African-American people
20th-century American academics